Angel and the Badman is a 1947 American Western film written and directed by James Edward Grant and starring John Wayne, Gail Russell, Harry Carey and Bruce Cabot. The film is about an injured gunfighter who is nursed back to health by a young Quaker woman and her family whose way of life influences him and his violent ways. Angel and the Badman was the first film Wayne produced as well as starred in, and was a departure for this genre at the time it was released. Writer-director James Edward Grant was Wayne's frequent screenwriting collaborator.

In 1975, the film entered the public domain in the United States because the claimants did not renew its copyright registration in the 28th year after publication.

Plot

Wounded and on the run, notorious gunman Quirt Evans gallops onto a farm owned by Quaker Thomas Worth and his family and collapses. When Quirt urgently insists upon sending a telegram, Thomas and his daughter Penelope drive him into town in their wagon. After wiring a claim to the land recorder's office, Quirt passes out, and Penny cradles him. Ignoring the doctor's advice to rid themselves of the gunman, the compassionate Worth family tends to the delirious Quirt, and Penny becomes intrigued by his ravings about past loves.

Days later, when Quirt regains consciousness, Penny patiently explains the family's belief in non-violence. Three weeks later, Laredo Stevens and Hondo Jeffries ride into town looking for Quirt. When Penny's younger brother Johnny rushes home to warn Quirt of his visitors, Quirt quickly prepares to flee. Penny, now smitten with Quirt, offers to run off with him. At the sound of approaching horses, Quirt grabs his gun and discovers that it has been emptied. Training his weapon on the doorway, Quirt calmly greets Hondo and Laredo. Thinking that Quirt has the upper hand, Laredo offers to buy his claim. When Quirt sets the price at $20,000, Laredo hands over $5,000 in gold and challenges him to come for the balance when he is able – if he has the nerve.

Afterward, Quirt saddles his horse, but when Penny begs him to stay, he changes his mind. Later, Quirt learns that cantankerous rancher Frederick Carson has dammed up the stream that runs through the valley, thus draining the Worths' irrigation ditches. Quirt intimidates Carson into opening the dam.

One Sunday, Penny asks Quirt to accompany the family to a Quaker meeting. Before they leave, Marshal Wistful McClintock comes to question Quirt about a stagecoach robbery. The family swears that Quirt was with them at the time. The marshal then asks Quirt why he resigned as Wyatt Earp's deputy, sold his ranch and crossed over to the wrong side of the law soon after cattleman Walt Ennis was gunned down in a saloon brawl. When Quirt refuses to answer, the marshal leaves. Penny then begs Quirt to steer clear of Laredo, and he acquiesces because of his love for her.

As Quirt and the Worths ride to the Quaker gathering, Quirt's erstwhile sidekick, Randy McCall, tags along. Randy tells Quirt that Laredo plans to rustle a herd of cattle and suggests that they then steal the herd from Laredo and let him take the blame. During the meeting, Mr. Worth presents Quirt with a Bible with his name on the cover, as an expression of gratitude for his role in ending the water feud with Carson. Fearing that he will never be able to live up to Penny's expectations, Quirt abruptly leaves with Randy.

Quirt and Randy steal the herd from the original rustlers. They then celebrate with showgirls Lila Neal and Christine Taylor. When Lila, sensing a change in her old flame, teases Quirt about his Bible, Quirt becomes angry and rides back to the Worth farm. Overjoyed, Penny throws her arms around him, just as the marshal arrives to question Quirt about the rustling. Quirt states that Lila can provide him with an alibi. Penny is hurt that Quirt was with his old flame. She heard him talk about Lila in his delirium, and thinks that Quirt prefers Lila's fair hair. Quirt realizes the depth of his feelings for Penny, and they kiss hungrily in the barn.

The marshal warns Quirt that he is the wrong man for Penny. Quirt decides to propose to her anyway. Instead of replying, Penny invites Quirt to join her picking blackberries. Quirt answers Penny's questions about his early life. Kindly Walt Ennis raised him after his parents were massacred by Indians; then Ennis was murdered.

On their way home, Quirt and Penny are ambushed and chased by Laredo and Hondo. Their  wagon plunges over a cliff into the river. Penny develops a dangerous fever after the drenching. When the doctor informs Quirt that there is no hope for her, Quirt straps on his pistol and rides into town to exact revenge. After Quirt leaves, Penny's fever suddenly breaks.

In town, Quirt sends Bradley to tell Laredo and Hondo that he is waiting for them in the street. Penny and her family arrive. She gets Quirt to surrender his gun to her. As Laredo and Hondo draw their guns, Marshal McClintock shoots them both. Quirt rides off in the wagon with Penny. The marshal picks up Quirt's discarded weapon. Bradley comments that Quirt may need it, to which the marshal says, "Only a man who carries a gun ever needs one."

Cast 

 John Wayne as Quirt Evans
 Gail Russell as Penelope Worth
 Harry Carey as Marshal Wistful McClintock
 Bruce Cabot as Laredo Stevens
 Irene Rich as Mrs. Worth
 Lee Dixon as Randy McCall
 Stephen Grant as Johnny Worth
 Tom Powers as Dr. Mangram
 Paul Hurst as Frederick Carson
 Olin Howland as Telegraph Operator Bradley
 John Halloran as Thomas Worth
 Joan Barton as Lila Neal
 Craig Woods as Ward Withers
 Marshall Reed as Nelson
 Paul Fix as Mouse Marr (uncredited) 
 Hank Worden as Townsman (uncredited) 
 Louis Faust as Hondo Jeffries (uncredited)
 Symona Boniface as Dance Hall Madam (uncredited)

Production

Filming
Principal photography took place from mid-April through late June 1946, in Flagstaff and Sedona, Arizona, and in Monument Valley in Utah.

Soundtrack
 "A Little Bit Different" (Kim Gannon and Walter Kent) by Joan Barton
 "Darling Nelly Gray" (Benjamin Russell Hamby) by Joan Barton and Lee Dixon

Production credits
 Director – James Edward Grant
 Producer – John Wayne
 Writer – James Edward Grant
 Music – Richard Hageman (musical score)
 Cinematography – Archie Stout (photography)
 Art direction – Ernst Fegté (production design), John McCarthy Jr. and Charles S. Thompson (set decorations)
 Second unit director – Yakima Canutt 
 Editor – Harry Keller
 Musical director – Cy Feuer 
 Sound – Vic Appel
 Costume design – Adele Palmer
 Special effects – Howard and Theodore Lydecker 
 Makeup supervision – Bob Mark
 Hair stylist – Peggy Gray

Song
In 1993, Johnny Cash wrote and sang a song inspired by this film called "Angel and the Badman".

Reception
Upon the film's release, The New York Times reviewer wrote, "Mr. Wayne and company have sacrificed the usual roaring action to fashion a leisurely Western, which is different from and a notch or two superior to the normal sagebrush saga." The reviewer continues:

The reviewer concludes, "John Wayne makes a grim and laconic, converted renegade, who is torn by love, a new faith and the desire for revenge on an arch enemy. Gail Russell, a stranger to Westerns, is convincing as the lady who makes him see the light."

Remake
The film was remade in 2009 for the Hallmark Channel by Terry Ingram, with Lou Diamond Phillips playing Quirt Evans and Wayne's grandson Brendan in a cameo appearance. The remake also stars Deborah Kara Unger as Temperance, Luke Perry as Laredo, and Terence Kelly as Thomas.

Angel and the Badman also inspired two other successful "fish out of water" films: Witness (1985) starring Harrison Ford, and The Outsider (2003), starring Tim Daly and Naomi Watts.

See also

 John Wayne filmography
 List of American films of 1947

References

External links

 
 
 
 
 

1947 films
1947 Western (genre) films
American Western (genre) films
American black-and-white films
Articles containing video clips
1940s English-language films
Films about Quakers
Films directed by James Edward Grant
Films produced by John Wayne
Films shot in Arizona
Films shot in Utah
Republic Pictures films
1940s American films